Jozef Metelka (born 8 September 1986) is a Slovak Paralympic racing cyclist competing in C4 classification events.

References

External links
Personal website

1986 births
Living people
Medalists at the 2016 Summer Paralympics
Para-cyclists
Paralympic gold medalists for Slovakia
Sportspeople from Piešťany
Slovak cyclists
Paralympic medalists in cycling
Cyclists at the 2016 Summer Paralympics
Medalists at the 2020 Summer Paralympics
Cyclists at the 2020 Summer Paralympics
21st-century Slovak people